Microdrosophila is a genus of vinegar flies, insects in the family Drosophilidae. There are at least 70 described species in Microdrosophila.

Species
These 76 species belong to the genus Microdrosophila:

 Microdrosophila acristata Okada, 1968 c g
 Microdrosophila bamanpuriensis Upadhyay & Singh, 2007 c g
 Microdrosophila bicornua Okada, 1985 c g
 Microdrosophila bilineata Kumar & Gupta, 1990 c g
 Microdrosophila bimaculata (Meijere, 1908) c g
 Microdrosophila bipartita Zhang, 1989 c g
 Microdrosophila bullata Takada & Momma, 1975 c g
 Microdrosophila chejuensis Lee & Kim, 1990 c g
 Microdrosophila chinsurae De & Gupta, 1994 c g
 Microdrosophila chuii Chen, 1994 c g
 Microdrosophila conda Zhang, 1989 c g
 Microdrosophila congesta (Zetterstedt, 1847) c g
 Microdrosophila conica Okada, 1985 c g
 Microdrosophila convergens (Malloch, 1934) c
 Microdrosophila cristata Okada, 1960 c g
 Microdrosophila cucullata Zhang, 1989 c g
 Microdrosophila curvula Zhang, 1989 c g
 Microdrosophila dentata Zhang, 1989 c g
 Microdrosophila discrepantia Bock, 1982 c g
 Microdrosophila distincta Wheeler & Takada, 1964 c g
 Microdrosophila duplicristata Okada, 1985 c g
 Microdrosophila elongata Okada, 1965 c g
 Microdrosophila falciformis Chen & Toda, 1994 c g
 Microdrosophila filamentea Okada, 1985 c g
 Microdrosophila frontata (Meijere, 1916) c g
 Microdrosophila furcata Okada, 1988 c g
 Microdrosophila fuscata Okada, 1960 c g
 Microdrosophila gangtokensis Gupta & Gupta, 1991 c g
 Microdrosophila gangwonensis Kim & Joo, 2002 c g
 Microdrosophila hasta Bock, 1982 c g
 Microdrosophila honoghensis Zhang, 1989 c g
 Microdrosophila jarrae Bock, 1982 c g
 Microdrosophila korogo Burla, 1954 c g
 Microdrosophila laticlavia Wheeler & Kambysellis, 1966 c g
 Microdrosophila latifrons Okada, 1965 c g
 Microdrosophila luchunensis Zhang, 1989 c g
 Microdrosophila mabi Burla, 1954 c g
 Microdrosophila macroctenia Okada, 1988 c g
 Microdrosophila maculata Okada, 1960 c g
 Microdrosophila magniflava Zhang, 1989 c g
 Microdrosophila mamaru (Burla, 1954) c g
 Microdrosophila marginata Okada, 1966 c g
 Microdrosophila matsudairai Okada, 1960 c g
 Microdrosophila neodistincta Sundaran & Gupta, 1990 c g
 Microdrosophila nigripalpis Okada, 1966 c g
 Microdrosophila nigrispina Okada, 1985 c g
 Microdrosophila nigrohalterata Okada, 1966 c g
 Microdrosophila ochracella Wheeler & Takada, 1964 c g
 Microdrosophila paradistincta De & Gupta, 1994 c g
 Microdrosophila pauciramosa Okada, 1966 c g
 Microdrosophila pectinata Okada, 1966 c g
 Microdrosophila peniciliata De & Gupta, 1994 c g
 Microdrosophila philippina Okada, 1985 c g
 Microdrosophila pleurolineata Wheeler & Takada, 1964 c g
 Microdrosophila pseudopleurolineata Okada, 1968 c g
 Microdrosophila purpurata Okada, 1956 c g
 Microdrosophila quadrata (Sturtevant, 1916) i c g b
 Microdrosophila residua Bock, 1982 c g
 Microdrosophila rhoparia Okada, 1985 c g
 Microdrosophila sagittatusa Chen, 1994 c g
 Microdrosophila sarawakana Okada, 1985 c g
 Microdrosophila serrata Okada, 1985 c g
 Microdrosophila setulosa Zhang, 1989 c g
 Microdrosophila sexsetosa (Duda, 1939) c g
 Microdrosophila sikkimensis Kumar & Gupta, 1990 c g
 Microdrosophila spiciferipennis Zhang, 1989 c g
 Microdrosophila submarginata Okada, 1965 c g
 Microdrosophila suvae Wheeler & Kambysellis, 1966 c g
 Microdrosophila tabularis Zhang, 1989 c g
 Microdrosophila takadai Bock, 1982 c g
 Microdrosophila tecifrons (Meijere, 1914) g
 Microdrosophila tectifrons (Meijere, 1914) c g
 Microdrosophila urashimae Okada, 1960 c g
 Microdrosophila virajpetiensis Sundaran & Gupta, 1990 c g
 Microdrosophila vittata Okada, 1985 c g
 Microdrosophila zetterstedti Wheeler, 1959 c g

Data sources: i = ITIS, c = Catalogue of Life, g = GBIF, b = Bugguide.net

References

Further reading

 

Drosophilidae genera
Articles created by Qbugbot